Gashnuiyeh-ye Bala (also Romanized as Gashnū’īyeh-ye Bālā; also known as Goshnū’īyeh, Gūshnūyeh, and Gūshnūyeh-ye Bālā) is a village in Dar Agah Rural District, in the Central District of Hajjiabad County, Hormozgan Province, Iran. At the 2006 census, its population was 52, in 14 families.

References 

 Populated places in Hajjiabad County